The 2020–21 CAF Champions League qualifying rounds were played from 28 November 2020 to 6 January 2021. A total of 54 teams competed in the qualifying rounds to decide the 16 places in the group stage of the 2020–21 CAF Champions League.

Draw

The draw for the qualifying rounds was held on 9 November 2020 at the CAF headquarters in Cairo, Egypt.

The entry round of the 54 teams entered into the draw was determined by their performances in the CAF competitions for the previous five seasons (CAF 5-Year Ranking points shown in parentheses).

Format

In the qualifying rounds, each tie was played on a home-and-away two-legged basis. If the aggregate score was tied after the second leg, the away goals rule would be applied, and if still tied, extra time would not be played, and the penalty shoot-out would be used to determine the winner (Regulations III. 13 & 14).

Schedule
The schedule of the competition was as follows.

Bracket
The bracket of the draw was announced by the CAF on 9 November 2020.

The 16 winners of the first round advanced to the group stage, while the 16 losers of the first round entered the Confederation Cup play-off round.

Preliminary round
The preliminary round, also called the first preliminary round, included the 44 teams that did not receive byes to the first round.

|}

Stade Malien won 4–1 on aggregate.

Teungueth won 3–1 on aggregate.

2–2 on aggregate. RC Abidjan won on away goals.

AS SONIDEP won 4–0 on aggregate.

Al Ahly Benghazi won on walkover after Mekelle 70 Enderta were not able to present themselves with 15 players (including 1 goalkeeper) for the first leg in Cairo citing the Tigray conflict.

Gazelle won on walkover after GR/SIAF failed to appear for the first leg in N'Djamena.

AS Bouenguidi won 2–0 on aggregate.

Jwaneng Galaxy won 5–1 on aggregate.

1–1 on aggregate. Young Buffaloes won on away goals.

Kaizer Chiefs won 1–0 on aggregate.

Al Merrikh won 3–1 on aggregate.

Enyimba won 2–1 on aggregate.

Asante Kotoko won 3–1 on aggregate.

Al Hilal won 2–0 on aggregate.

MC Alger won 6–2 on aggregate.

CS Sfaxien won 8–1 on aggregate.

Nkana won 1–0 on aggregate.

Petro de Luanda won 3–2 on aggregate.

FC Platinum won 4–1 on aggregate.

Simba won 1–0 on aggregate.

CR Belouizdad won 4–0 on aggregate.

Gor Mahia won 4–3 on aggregate.

First round
The first round, also called the second preliminary round, included 32 teams: the 10 teams that received byes to this round, and the 22 winners of the preliminary round.

Wydad Casablanca won 3–1 on aggregate.

0–0 on aggregate. Teungueth won 3–1 on penalties.

Horoya won 2–1 on aggregate.

Al Ahly won 5–0 on aggregate.

Espérance de Tunis won 3–2 on aggregate.

Zamalek won on walkover after Gazelle were disqualified by CAF for failing to appear for the first leg in Cairo.

TP Mazembe won 4–2 on aggregate.

Mamelodi Sundowns won 5–1 on aggregate.

AS Vita Club won 6–3 on aggregate.

Kaizer Chiefs won 1–0 on aggregate.

Al Merrikh won 4–2 on aggregate.

Al Hilal won 3–0 on aggregate.

MC Alger won 2–1 on aggregate.

Petro de Luanda won 2–1 on aggregate.

Simba won 4–1 on aggregate.

CR Belouizdad won 8–1 on aggregate.

Notes

References

External links
Total CAF Champions League, CAFonline.com
CAF Total Champions League 2020/21

1
November 2020 sports events in Africa
December 2020 sports events in Africa
January 2021 sports events in Africa